Asu (also known as Abewa or Ebe) is a Nupoid language spoken in Niger State in Western Nigeria. The Asu live in about ten villages southeast of Kontagora.

References

Languages of Nigeria
Nupoid languages